The Bilaspur–Rewa Express is an Express train belonging to South East Central Railway zone that runs between  and Rewa Terminal in India. It is currently being operated with 18247/18248 train numbers on a daily basis. The updated link form wag-5 is wap-7 bhilai shed.

Service

The 18247/Bilaspur–Rewa Express has an average speed of 41 km/hr and covers 467 km in 11h 15m. The 18248/Rewa–Bilaspur Express has an average speed of 40 km/hr and covers 467 km in 11h 40m.

Route and halts 

The important halts of the train are:

Coach composition

The train has standard ICF rakes with max speed of 110 kmph. The train consists of 14 coaches :

 4 Sleeper coaches
1 AC 3 Tier Coach (recently added)
 7 General Unreserved
 2 Seating cum Luggage Rake

Traction

Both trains were hauled by a Bhilai Electric Loco Shed-based WAG-5 or WAM-4 electric locomotive from Bilaspur to Katni before! Now the new link up to Katni for the train is WAP-7 of Bhilai Electric Loco Shed. From Katni, trains are hauled by a Katni Diesel Loco Shed-based WDM-3A or WDG-3A locomotive up til Rewa.

See also 

 Bilaspur Junction railway station
 Rewa Terminal railway station

Notes

References

External links 

 18247/Bilaspur - Rewa Express
 18248/Rewa - Bilaspur Express

Transport in Rewa, Madhya Pradesh
Transport in Bilaspur, Chhattisgarh
Express trains in India
Rail transport in Chhattisgarh
Rail transport in Madhya Pradesh
Railway services introduced in 2017